William H. Fralin, Jr. (born February 8, 1963) is an American politician and lawyer. He was a Republican member of the Virginia House of Delegates 2004–2010, representing the 17th district in the western part of the state, made up of parts of Botetourt and Roanoke Counties and the city of Roanoke.

Electoral history

Notes

External links

1963 births
Living people
Republican Party members of the Virginia House of Delegates
Virginia lawyers
University of Virginia alumni
University of Richmond School of Law alumni
21st-century American politicians